Gertrude Charlotte Moakley (February 18, 1905 – March 28, 1998) was an American librarian and a Tarot scholar. Moakley is notable for having written the earliest and most significant account of the iconography of Tarot, a card game which originated in the Italian Renaissance. She had worked at the New York Public Library.

Today, Tarot is both a popular game, and an object of fascination for occultists, fortune-tellers, and New Age enthusiasts around the world. Although Moakley wrote and spoke on these latter subjects (in Moakley, 1954; Papus, 1958; Waite, 1959), she is remembered for having written one of the few scholarly books about the history of Tarot and the meaning of the allegorical trump cards. Her 1956 article on the subject and her 1966 book were both praised by Erwin Panofsky, the foremost art historian of the Warburg School, as well as by Michael Dummett, the preeminent scholar of playing-card and Tarot history.

Biography 
Moakley was born in Pittsburgh, Pennsylvania, on February 18, 1905, to parents Arthur Irving Moakley and Josephine Henry (née Barrett). 

She received a B.A. degree in classics from Barnard College in 1926 and a B.S. degree in library science from the Columbia University School of Library Science in 1928. While attending Barnard in 1926, she was awarded the Tatlock Prize (named in honor of Jean Tatlock). 

After graduation, Moakley began working as a librarian for the New York Public Library (NYPL). She lectured on catalog arrangement at New York University, published articles in the NYPL Bulletin and the Journal of Cataloging and Classification. She served as chair of a special committee which revised the Filing Code of the NYPL Circulation Department.  

Moakley had served as the chairperson for the American Library Association. She was also chairman of a committee that revised the ALA Rules for Filing Catalog Cards. She appears in directories of librarians from 1933 through 1970, and she published several books on filing codes. 

She had moved to Florida in 1984. Moakley died in St. Petersburg, Florida, on March 28, 1998.

Moakley and modern tarot
The contemporary fascination with Tarot developed in the 1970s, but two decades earlier Moakley was writing and speaking about the subject. She published articles, wrote introductions for two of the most influential books on the subject, and was invited by Eden Gray to appear on the Long John Nebel late-night radio program In 1954, Moakley published an article, "The Waite-Smith Tarot: A Footnote to The Waste Land" about T.S. Eliot's use of Tarot motifs in his 1922 work The Waste Land. 

In his notes to the poem, Eliot refers to the "traditional" Tarot deck. Moakley argued that he was actually alluding to the Waite-Smith Tarot deck. Traditional Tarot decks date back to the Fifteenth Century, while the Waite-Smith deck was created by Arthur Edward Waite little more than a decade before Eliot's poem. This modern deck incorporated many substantial differences from earlier decks. Moakley argued that "the man with three staves", which Eliot insisted was "an authentic member of the Tarot pack", confirms the identity of his deck as Waite-Smith, the only deck at that time to have such a card. Her article has been cited repeatedly in the literature on Eliot's poem.

In 1958, Waite's translation of Tarot of the Bohemians, by Gérard Encausse (Papus), was republished with an introduction by Moakley. As background, in the hope that even non-cultist readers might appreciate the book, she summarized some of the notable appropriations of the Tarot of the previous fifty years. These included Eliot, Jessie Weston's From Ritual to Romance, and Charles Williams' The Greater Trumps. She also mentioned W.B. Yeats's interest in the Tarot and the occult, and the relevance of Tarot to some of Carl Jung's followers. Moakley argued that understanding the Tarot required knowledge of both the literal facts of Tarot history and the mythic musings of artists and occultists. This dual focus is characteristic of the more thoughtful New Age writers who promote Tarot today.

In 1959, Waite's Pictorial Key to the Tarot was republished with an introduction by Moakley. The reprint was prefaced with a quote from one of Waite's last books, The Holy Grail. It alluded to a relation between Tarot and the Holy Grail, and "certain secret records now existing in Europe...." It connects the suit-signs of Tarot to the so-called Grail Hallows, and thereby to Celtic lore. (Waite and Eliot both borrowed from Weston). Moakley repeatedly mentioned this common theme of 20th-century Tarot enthusiasts, including writers like Eliot as well as occultists and folklorists. This connection was later incorporated into works like Holy Blood, Holy Grail and The Da Vinci Code.

Moakley's introduction to The Pictorial Key provided some personal insight into Waite's character, his humor, mysticism, and scholarship. Moakley also foreshadowed the emphasis of later writers on the artist of the Waite-Smith deck, Pamela Colman Smith. Several pages of biographical information on Smith were included, indicating the importance of the illustrator to the final product. Moakley's writing reveals a fondness for and understanding of all her subjects, whether occultists like Encausse, scholars like Waite, or artists like Smith.  

Her introduction closes with an expansion on the theme presented in Tarot of the Bohemians, concerning the value of such things as the Tarot. Moakley suggested that art, psychology, and mystic meditation can be valuable adjuncts to rational modern life. She wrote that Waite's Tarot may help "tease the imagination out of its old ruts". "By such a use of the Tarot the poisons of our cultural conditioning might be turned into healing balms, and a barrier into a gateway." 

In The Pictorial Key, Moakley also contributed a section on the rules for playing the game of Tarot. This brief, 6-page summary of the game begins by describing a 15th-century fresco in the Palazzo Borromeo in Milan, Italy. The painting shows wealthy card players, the kind who enjoyed the gilded Tarot cards of the Visconti-Sforza style, playing the game. This, along with a description of the rules, constitutes a powerful reminder that the modern Tarot of Eliot and Waite is a very different thing from the historical Tarot of 15th-century Milan.

Visconti-Sforza Tarot

One of the most significant insights Moakley contributed was her recognition that Tarot was primarily a card game, and that the game was called trionfi. Moakley had identified the original name of the Tarot as Trionfi, as in carte da trionfi. This was not conventional wisdom either then, in the 1950s, nor now. Understanding whether the artifact at hand is a deck of cards to play a card game, like many others, or an occult manifesto-like, or a fortune-telling device like an Ouija board, 

Moakley studied a particular historical Tarot deck, usually known as the Visconti-Sforza deck. Moakley's book correctly identified the provenance of the Visconti-Sforza deck, the family for which it was created, and reported on them in some detail. In addition, she investigated the life and work of the Cremonese painter, Bonifacio Bembo, and his relationship with the Visconti-Sforza family. Six replacement cards were painted by a different hand, decades after the deck was originally created. These have been attributed to various artists, including Bembo's brother Benedetto.)

In addition to being a richly painted and gilded artifact, the Visconti-Sforza deck is one of the earliest surviving Tarot decks, probably made within a decade of the game's invention, and one of the most complete decks from the first half-century of Tarot. Numerous other luxury decks appear to have been modeled on the same pattern, probably from a workshop in Cremona. The design of the Visconti-Sforza is characteristic of the large majority of all later Tarot decks. Moakley's book included B&W reproductions of all 74 cards, and identified the subject matter of all surviving trump cards, using period-appropriate names from 15th-century sources. She also correctly identified the suit signs as typical of early Italian decks, being Cups, Coins, Swords, and Staves.

Reception

Some aspects of Moakley's understanding of the Tarot have proven perfectly sound. Unlike most writers before and since she approached the Tarot as a card game from 15th-century Italy rather than an esoteric manifesto of mysterious origin and transmission. In 1980, Michael Dummett's comprehensive study of Tarot history, The Game of Tarot, confirmed and documented in great detail the correctness of those conclusions. Likewise, the art-historical approach to understanding the subject matter on the cards has proven more productive than occult impositions. This approach included focusing on a specific, very early deck of identifiable provenance, which enabled the identification of numerous specific Visconti and Sforza emblems on the cards.

A significant part of Moakley's interpretation involved the suit signs being related to the allegory of the trumps. This has generally been ignored. The Latin suit-signs as emblems of the virtues echoes a 16th-century Bolognese allegorization of the suits by Innocentio Ringhieri, and is one of many allegorical readings of suit-signs over the centuries. However, the idea that the suit cards represented allegorical companies in a pageant intended to accompany the trump cards is simply false: The suit cards were standard for many decades prior to the invention of Tarot's trump cards and were directly adopted from 14th-century Arabic playing cards. Her interpretation of the trump cards, however, has been influential. Even popular Tarot books routinely mention something about Moakley and Petrarch.

While Moakley's general thesis, that the trump cards were called carte da trioni because they formed an allegorical hierarchy of triumphs, has received support, her explanation of the specifics of the Tarot trump cycle is less well received. Robert V. O'Neill summarized the problem most directly.

"The explanation is that the Tarot is not only a simplification of Petrarch's scheme but also a spoof, a ribald take-off on the solemnity of the original story in the spirit of the Carnival parade. This explanation is not acceptable simply because it allows too much freedom. Any lack of correspondence can be passed off as part of the joke. Therefore, if the cards match it is taken as positive evidence for the theory, while any discrepancy is dismissed offhand. This is too simplistic."

That criticism, that Moakley's interpretation is an ad hoc gloss rather than an explanatory analysis, is given a broader application by Dummett.

Alternative interpretations

In the 16th century, there were two Italian authors who wrote essays on the meaning of Tarot. Both presented the trump cycle as a moral allegory rather than an esoteric manifesto, secret codebook, rituals of initiation, fortune-telling device, representation of some precursor work of art or literature, or one of the various other genres to which the trumps have been assigned by occultists and 20th-century writers. In the 19th century there were some writers who suggested that the meaning of the Tarot trump cards was most closely related to the Dance of Death works of pre-modern art. This is closely related to the moral allegories suggested by the two Renaissance writers. Both approaches to the trumps are similar to Moakley's, given that Petrarch's Trionfi is itself a moral allegory centered around the triumph of Death, and that other variations on Petrarch's were popular artistic themes in cassoni and birth trays.

In the 18th and 19th centuries, the occult Tarot was invented. Writers with little knowledge of or interest in the historical facts of the Tarot simply made up stories. In the 20th century, countless fortune-tellers, occultists, and New Age writers have offered variations on the themes of 18th- and 19th-century occultists. In addition, a number of new themes were suggested in Alfred Douglas' 1972 book, speculations which continue to inspire esotericists today. One theme that is worth mentioning is the Fool's Journey. This was established and promoted in the 1960s and 1970s by Eden Gray, and has become a cornerstone of modern, esoteric Tarot interpretations. Perhaps the most notable advocate of this interpretation was Theodore Roszak, a prominent social critic and author of The Making of a Counter Culture (1969). His 1988 booklet, Fool's Cycle/Full Cycle: Reflections on the Great Trumps of the Tarot, presents a fairly standard example of the interpretation.

William Marston Seabury and Joseph Campbell suggested a different approach; they both asserted that the Tarot trump cards had some connection with Dante Alighieri's masterpiece, Divine Comedy. John Shephard attempted to explain the trumps and their sequence by reference to a medieval astrological concept known as Children of the Planets. Timothy Betts attempted to explain the trumps as a representation of medieval Christian legends about the Last Emperor and eschatological events. The vast majority of 20th-century interpretations explicitly appeal to would-be mystics, fortune-tellers, and enthusiasts whose primary interest in Tarot history and iconography is validation of New Age folklore and esoteric practices. The fact that Moakley's writings were intended to reach a broader audience, and to address more objective historical questions, distinguishes them.

Publications

Books and articles 
 "The Waite-Smith Tarot: A Footnote to The Waste Land", Bulletin of the New York Public Library, 1954, v.58, pp. 471-475.
 "The Tarot Trumps and Petrarch's Trionfi: Some Suggestions on their Relationship", Bulletin of the New York Public Library, 1956, v.60, pp. 55-69.

Contributions

See also
 Fortune telling
 Occultism
 Tarot card reading
Trionfi (cards)

Footnotes

References

Further reading 
 Caldwell, Ross, Thierry Depaulis, and Marco Ponzi. Explaining the Tarot: Two Italian Renaissance Essays on the Meaning of the Tarot Pack. Oxford: Maproom Publications, 2010.
Carnicelli, D.D., and Francesco Petrarch. Lord Morley's "Tryumphes of Fraunces Petrarcke": The First English Translation of the "Trionfi". Cambridge: Harvard University Press, 1971.
Decker, Ronald, Thierry Depaulis, and Michael Dummett. A Wicked Pack of Cards: The Origins of the Occult Tarot. New York: St. Martin's Press, 1996.
Dummett, Michael, and John McLeod. A History of the Games Played with the Tarot Pack: The Game of Triumphs. London: Edwin Mellon, 2004.
 Panofsky, Erwin. Meaning in the Visual: Papers In and On Art History Arts. New York: Doubleday, 1955.

External links
Erwin Panofsky Papers, 1904–1990, Archives of American Art, Smithsonian Institution.
 Petrarch's Trionfi
 Petrarch's Trionfi and Tarot

1905 births
1998 deaths
Barnard College alumni
Columbia University School of Library Service alumni
New York Public Library people
Independent scholars
Tarotologists
Libertarian historians
People from Pittsburgh
People from St. Petersburg, Florida